"Rang Barse Bhige Chunar Wali" (Hindi: रंग बरसे भीगे चूनर वाली) is a popular 1981 Hindi song from Bollywood movie Silsila. The song "Rang Barse Bhige Chunarwali" which Amitabh Bachchan sings during the film is said to be one of India's best known folk songs. The music director was Shiv-Hari, both also noted classical musicians. The taal (rhythm) of the song is Keherwa (Kaharva) of Hindustani classical music, while the lyrics were by poet Harivansh Rai Bachchan, based on a traditional bhajan, by 15th-century mystic poet Meera.

The song was featured in a film sequence showing a community Holi celebration with film's cast, and hence got link with Holi festivities.

Origins
It is believed that the tune and lyrics of this song are taken from a Rajasthani and Haryanvi folk bhajan about Meera. However the lyrics are slightly altered into the Awadhi dialect of Hindi to mould the song into appropriate context of the movie script. First few lines of the original bhajan are:

Rang barse o meeran, bhawan main rang barse..
Kun e meera tero mandir chinayo, kun chinyo tero devro...
Rang barse o meeran, bhawan main rang barse''

In popular culture
Even after three decades of its release, 'Rang Barse' remains one of the most popular songs played on the occasion of festival Holi in north India.

See also
 Meera
 Shiv-Hari

References 

 Rang Barse Bheege Chunarwali Song on Gaana
 

1981 songs
Holi
Indian folk songs
Hindi film songs
Culture of Uttar Pradesh